, also known as  or Okura Pictures, is the largest and one of the oldest independent Japanese studios which produce and distribute pink films. It was founded in 1961 by Mitsuru Ōkura, former president of film studio Shintōhō. Along with Shintōhō Eiga, Kantō, Million Film, and Kōji Wakamatsu's production studio, Ōkura was one of the most influential studios on the pink film genre. Among the many notable pink films released by the studio are Satoru Kobayashi's Flesh Market (1962), the first film in the pink film genre.

Ōkura Eiga in the 1960s
Mitsuru Ōkura was the president of the major film studio, Shintōhō, from 1955 until the studio's bankruptcy in May 1961. He produced numerous films during this time, including Emperor Meiji and the Great Russo-Japanese War (1957), which held the Japanese box office record of 20million admissions for decades, up until its record was broken by Hayao Miyazaki's Studio Ghibli anime film Spirited Away (2001).

In keeping with his carnival barker roots, Ōkura had moved Shintōhō into exploitation film genres during his time at the studio. Among the genres in which the studio specialized under Ōkura were horror, science-fiction, war, crime and sex films. The same year of Shintōhō's demise, Ōkura founded the Ōkura Eiga studio.  Ōkura established his new studio by setting up production in Shintōhō's facilities in Setagaya, Tokyo which he had purchased with his own company. Shintōhō employee Kouichi Gotō bought the studio's Kansai studio as well as the use of the studio name to start up a new enterprise, Shintōhō Eiga. After Ōkura, Shintōhō Eiga is currently the second largest pink film studio.

The early titles produced at Ōkura Eiga indicate that the films from Ōkura's new studio continued the themes pioneered at Shintōhō. Director Satoru Kobayashi's all-color 1963 film, The Mysterious Pearl of the Ama, for example, looks back to Shintōhō's boundary-pushing female pearl-diver films of the mid-1950s, starring Michiko Maeda and Yōko Mihara. Kobayashi continued to occasionally make films in this style for Ōkura as late as 1995 with  starring actresses Nao Saejima and Yumi Yoshiyuki, who would become a prominent pink film director herself, releasing mainly through Ōkura.

Kobayashi had worked with Ōkura at Shintōhō since 1954 and came with him to the new studio. Kobayashi's name in the history of cinema was ensured when he directed the first pink film, Flesh Market, in 1962 at Ōkura Eiga. When the police confiscated the film, two days after its release, the studio quickly patched together another version from extra footage, and Flesh Market became a huge success.

The assistant director on Flesh Market, Kin'ya Ogawa who had come from an old Kabuki family, was one of Ōkura's most important directors during the 1960s. This was the first film in the "Part color" format in which key scenes—usually sex scenes—were shot in color while the rest of the film was in monochrome. Most of Ogawa's output during the 1960s was released through Ōkura. Though Ōkura had established the pink film genre—called "eroductions" until the late 1960s—with the release of Kobayashi's Flesh Market in 1962, Ōkura would not devote its resources entirely to pink until after the failure of Kiyoshi Komori's big-budget war epic,   (1962), and the tremendous success of Ogawa's  (January 1965).

At Ōkura, Ogawa initiated one of the most popular themes in pink film, the "urban paranoia" story. His trilogy of films beginning with Conception and Venereal Disease (1968) was an example of this genre, in which an innocent country girl is corrupted by life in the big city. Ogawa also directed "pink kaidan" or erotic ghost stories for Ōkura, and it is with these titles for which he is best remembered. Ōkura was involved in the international distribution system involving softcore pornographic films beginning in the mid-1960s. Both films were made for Ōkura. Ogawa stayed with Ōkura for six years, joining Million Film in 1970 and later working at Shintōhō Eiga and Nikkatsu.

To help fill the double- or triple-bill programs in his own theatres, Ōkura imported yō-pin or "Western pink" into Japan. These were softcore sexploitation films of the type that were shown in western grindhouse's and drive-ins. Ōkura also claims to have produced the first pink film directed by a woman. Kyōko Ōgimachi, an actress in Shintōhō's ama films of the 1950s, directed Yakuza Geisha in 1965. However Jasper Sharp reports that several pink film insiders are skeptical of this claim, as Ōgimachi was Mitsugu Ōkura's mistress, and he was known to treat her with favoritism.

The Weissers write that standard Ōkura Eiga product of the 1960s was a low-budget affair with a forgettable plot which existed only to provide actresses to appear in the nude. One of Ōkura's most popular actresses in their late 1960s output was the shapely Mari Iwai. Iwai was especially known for her roles in coming of age films. Pink film queen Noriko Tatsumi appeared in films for Ōkura, including  (December 1967), made between the shooting on Atsushi Yamatoya's cult pink film, Inflatable Sex Doll of the Wastelands. After her career got off to a bad start with cult horror director Kinnosuke Fukada's disastrous foray into pink, Pleasure Trap (Kairaku no Wana, Kokuei, early 1967), actress Keiko Kayama took the unusual step for the time of initiating a publicity campaign.

Ōkura and OP Eiga in the 1970s and 1980s
By the time the major studio, Nikkatsu took over the sexploitation genre in the early 1970s with its Roman Porno films, a distribution system for independent pink films had been established, with Ōkura and Shintōhō Eiga controlling most of the venues. Ōkura's production arm was eventually named OP Eiga, while the distribution retained the Ōkura name. Typical of the studio's output in the 1980s, director Kazuhisa Ogawa, with regular star Mayumi Sanjo specialized in a series of college girl films. This series had Ogawa seeking revenge for rape, but, unlike typical rape and revenge films, the first offense was not entirely unwelcomed, and the resulting revenge tends to be light-weight acts of humiliation.

The Weissers write that Jō Ichimura's 1991 film  is a "revolutionary" pink film which has acquired a cult following in the years since its initial release.

Along with the exclusively gay-themed ENK studio, OP Eiga is one of very few studios to regularly produce gay pink film, such as Kuninori Yamazaki's award-winning  (October 1993). A former journalist, That's When Things Changed was Yamazaki's directorial debut. Praised by critics for its intellectual themes, it was not as heartily embraced by regular pink film audiences. Openly gay actor-screenwriter Kouichi Imaizumi has become a key figure in the emergence of gay pink film by writing several scripts directed by Yumi Yoshiyuki for OP Eiga which help to bring a more realism to gay-themed pink films.

OP Eiga today
Neither has OP Eiga attempted to court overseas audiences, though Jasper Sharp asserts that OP Eiga's films would be popular with foreign audiences. Nevertheless, OP Eiga continues to be a major force in the pink film genre, both because of its prolific output, and because its films are consistently named among the "Best Ten" of the year at the annual Pink Grand Prix. At the 2007 ceremony covering the year 2006, for example. all three top films were from OP Eiga. Best Films of the year produced by OP Eiga include Sad and Painful Search: Office Lady Essay (Tarō Araki, 2000), A Saloon Wet with Beautiful Women (Tatsuro Kashihara, 2002), Fascinating Young Hostess: Sexy Thighs (Tetsuya Takehora, 2006), Molester's Train: Sensitive Fingers (Yoshikazu Katō, 2007), and the most recent Best Film, director Yoshikazu Katō's  (2009). In recognition of its place in the pink film genre, the studio itself was given a special award in 1996.

Personnel and output

Directors
Notable directors whose films have been produced or released by Ōkura Eiga / OP Eiga include:

Actors and actresses
Notable actors and actresses who have performed at Ōkura Eiga / OP Eiga include:

Films
Notable films produced and/or released by Ōkura Eiga / OP Eiga include:

  (Satoru Kobayashi, 1962)
  (Masanao Sakao, 1967)
  (Yoshihiro Isikawa, 1968)
  (Kinya Ogawa, 1969)
  (Yutaka Ikejima, 2000)
  (Tarō Araki, 2000)
  (Tarō Araki, 2001)
  (Minoru Kunizawa, 2001)
  (Tarō Araki, 2001)
  (Yutaka Ikejima, 2002)
  (Tarō Araki, 2002)
  (Tatsurō Kashihara, 2002)
  (Yutaka Ikejima, 2003)
  (Minoru Kunizawa, 2003)
  (Tarō Araki, 2003)
  (Minoru Kunizawa, 2003)
  (Yumi Yoshiyuki, 2004)
  (Tarō Araki, 2004)
  (Tetsuya Takehora, 2004)
  (Shigeo Moriyama, 2004)
  (Yutaka Ikejima, 2004)
  (Minoru Kunizawa, 2005)
  (Tetsuya Takehora, 2005)
  (Yumi Yoshiyuki, 2005)
  (Yumi Yoshiyuki, 2005)
  (Tetsuya Takehora, 2006)
  (Yumi Yoshiyuki, 2006)
  (Yutaka Ikejima, 2006)
  (Tetsuya Takehora, 2006)
  (Yutaka Ikejima, 2006)
  (Kuninori Yamazaki, 2007)
  (Yutaka Ikejima, 2007)
  (Shigeo Moriyama, 2007)
  (Yumi Yoshiyuki, 2007)
  (Yoshikazu Katō, 2007)
  (Yumi Yoshiyuki, 2007)
  (Tetsuya Takehora, 2007) 
  (Tetsuya Takehora, 2008)
  (Yutaka Ikejima, 2008)
  (Naoyuki Tomomatsu, 2008)
  (Tetsuya Takehora, 2009)

Bibliography

English

Japanese

Notes

Mass media companies established in 1961
Mass media companies based in Tokyo
Film production companies of Japan
1961 establishments in Japan